Sarhadein is an Indian television series which aired on Zee TV . The story narrates the similarities between the people living in two countries. Besides, it won a numerous awards at the time it was on-air, such as the Indian television actor Govind Namdeo won "Best Actor in a Negative Role" award for his role "Kedar Nath" at the Indian Telly Awards in 2002. The series was produced by UTV Software Communications and set in the backdrop of Kuala Lumpur, Malaysia. It averaged 1.5 TRPs at the time it was on air.

Overview
Sarhadein is a love story of an Indian girl and a Pakistani boy who fall in love with each other while studying in Kuala Lumpur. They get together by a case of mistaken identities but religion and restrictions loom over their love. Now the question remains is that will their parents' be able to accept their relationship once they go back to India and Pakistan? Will the society ever approve of their love, since they belong to different religion and enemy neighboring countries.

Cast
 Smita Bansal as Chandni
 Aamir Bashir as Aman
 Hussain Kuwajerwala as Annu
 Govind Namdev as Kedarnath
 Vaquar Shaikh as Rajesh
 Ravi Gossain as Sohail
 Kuljeet Randhawa
 Kishwer Merchant
 Shagufta Ali
 Ali Asgar
 Surendra Pal
 Sudha Shivpuri
 Amar Talwar
 Homi Wadia
 Kusumit Sana

References

Zee TV original programming
Indian television series
2001 Indian television series debuts
2003 Indian television series endings
UTV Television
Television shows set in Malaysia
Television shows set in Pakistan
Television shows set in India
India–Pakistan relations in popular culture